γ Monocerotis, Latinised as Gamma Monocerotis, is a binary star system in the equatorial constellation of Monoceros. Based upon an annual parallax shift of 6.55 mas, it is located roughly 500 light years from the Sun. It can be viewed with the naked eye, having an apparent visual magnitude of 3.96. Gamma Monocerotis is moving away from the Sun with a radial velocity of −5 km/s.

The Ba0.3 suffix indicates this is a mild barium star, which means the spectrum displays abnormal abundance of s-process elements, including barium. These were deposited by an orbiting companion as it passed through the asymptotic giant branch stage. The companion is now a white dwarf star.

It has reported companions B, at separation 53.7" and magnitude 13.1, and C, at separation 47.9" and magnitude 13.6.

References 

K-type giants
Barium stars
Monoceros (constellation)
Monocerotis, Gamma
Monocerotis, 05
BD-06 1469
043232
029651
2227